Frédéric Lemoine (born 27 June 1965) is a French businessman. He was Chairman of Wendel's Executive Board from April 2009 until December 2017.
 He was a member of the Supervisory Board of Wendel from June 2008 to April 2009. Since April 2009, he has been a board member of Saint-Gobain. Since January 2011, he has been a board member of Insead. Since 2014, he has been a board member of Orchestre à l'Ecole.

Early life and education
Lemoine graduated from HEC Paris in 1986 and Sciences Po in 1987. He holds a law degree and is a graduate of École nationale d'administration (Victor Hugo promotion).

Career in the public sector
From 1995 to 1997, Lemoine served as deputy chief of staff of the Minister of Labor and Social Affairs Jacques Barrot in the government of Prime Minister Alain Juppé, in charge of coordinating reform of the national health insurance system and hospital reform. At the same time he was a chargé de mission with the Secretary of State for Healthcare and the National Health Insurance system Hervé Gaymard.

From May 2002 to June 2004, Lemoine was deputy General Secretary of the French Presidency with President Jacques Chirac, in charge of economic and financial affairs and other areas.

In 1992 and 1993, Lemoine headed the Institut du Coeur of Hô Chi Minh-City, in Vietnam, for a year. From 2004 to May 2011, he was General Secretary of the Fondation Alain Carpentier, which supports this hospital.

Career in the private sector
From 1998 to 2002, Lemoine was delegated CEO, then CFO of Capgemini, and then Group VP in charge of finance of Capgemini Ernst & Young.

From October 2004 to May 2008, Lemoine was Senior Advisor to McKinsey. Since April 2009, he has been a board member of Saint-Gobain.

After the family controlled private equity group Wendel parted company with its chief executive Jean-Bernard Lafonta in 2009, Lemoine was appointed as his successor. He served in this position from April 2009 to December 2017.

Ahead of the 2022 presidential elections, Lemoine publicly declared his support for Valérie Pécresse as the Republicans’ candidate and joined her campaign team.

Other activities

Corporate boards
 Lauxera Capital Partners, Special Advisor (since 2020)
 Constantia Flexibles, Chairman of the Supervisory Board 
 Bureau Veritas, Vice-Chairman of the Board of Directors (2009-2013, 2017), Chairman of the Board of Directors (2013-2017)
 Flamel Technologies, Member of the Board of Directors (2005-2017)
 Groupama SA, Member of the Board of Directors (2005-2012)
 Legrand, Member of the Board of Directors (2009-2013)
 Générale de Santé, Member of the Supervisory Board (2006-2009)
 Areva, Chairman of the Advisory Board (2005-2009)
 McKinsey, Special Advisor (2004–2008)

Non-profit organizations
 Alliance for International Medical Action (ALIMA), Member of the Board (since 2018)
 INSEAD, Member of the Board (since 2011)
 Trilateral Commission, Member of the European Group
 Paris Europlace, Member of the Board of Directors
 Fondation Alain Carpentier, Secretary General (2004-2013)

Recognition
Lemoine is a Knight of the National Order of Merit and a Knight of the Legion of Honour.

External links 
 Frédéric Lemoine's profile on Forbes.com
 Frédéric Lemoine's executive profile and biography on Bloomberg BusinessWeek
 "Wendel completes largest exit of the year: new chief Lemoine oversees €630m sale of Oranje-Nassau oil arm", European Venture Capital Journal - June 1, 2009
 "Wendel set to rejoin hunt for acquisitions", Financial Times - November 3, 2009
 "Wendel Posts Jump in Asset Value on Saint-Gobain, Bureau Veritas", Bloomberg - December 2, 2010
 "Frédéric Lemoine, privatisé" (Radio BFM - August 26, 2010)
 Interview: Frédéric Lemoine, Chairman of Wendel's Executive Board, comments on the Group's Investor Day and discusses its strategy for 2010 - December 4, 2009
 Interview: Frédéric Lemoine, Chairman of Wendel's Executive Board, comments on the Group's Investor Day and discusses its strategy for 2012 – December 2, 2011
 Interview of Frédéric Lemoine with the Financial Times: "Wendel on European acquisition hunt" - February 13, 2012
 Interview: Frédéric Lemoine, Chairman of Wendel's Executive Board, comments on 2012 first halt results - September 3, 2012
 Interview: Frederic Lemoine, Chairman of Wendel's Executive Board on BFM TV - September 28th, 2013
 A French group Wendel to conquer Africa, July 25th, 2013
 Interview with Chairman of Wendel's Executive Board, Frédéric Lemoine for Wendel 2013 full year results, March, 28th, 2014

References 

1965 births
Living people
French chief executives
Lycée Louis-le-Grand alumni
HEC Paris alumni
Sciences Po alumni
École nationale d'administration alumni
People from Neuilly-sur-Seine
Chevaliers of the Légion d'honneur